Alexander Rainnie (22 June 1891 – 1965) was a Scottish footballer who played as a wing half in the Football League for Newcastle United, Darlington and Ashington. He also played non-league football for Hebburn Argyle and South Shields.

Football career
Rainnie played football as a wing half for North Eastern League clubs Hebburn Argyle before the First World War and for South Shields after it. Described as a "resourceful right half", he signed for Football League club Newcastle United ahead of the 1919–20 season, but played mainly for their reserve team in the North Eastern League. He appeared only once for the first team, in a 4–0 defeat at Everton on 24 January 1920 in the First Division, and moved back to the North Eastern League with Darlington for 1920–21.

He helped Darlington win the North Eastern League title, which contributed to their election to the newly formed Northern Section of the Football League Third Division. He made eight appearances in the League, without scoring, and played for them until at least 1922. He made one appearance for Ashington in the 1923–24 Football League season.

Personal life
Rainnie was born in Seafield, Banffshire, in Scotland, the son of William Thompson Rainnie, a shipwright, and his wife, Isabella née Legg. He was raised in England, in Hebburn, County Durham, where he attended Hebburn Quay School.

Rainnie married Isabella Prentice in South Shields in 1924. The couple are listed on the 1939 Register as living in Hebburn; Rainnie was working as a safety inspector and serving as an ARP Warden. He died in County Durham in 1965 at the age of 73.

References

1891 births
1965 deaths
People from Banffshire
People from Hebburn
Footballers from Tyne and Wear
Scottish footballers
Association football wing halves
Hebburn Argyle F.C. players
South Shields F.C. (1889) players
Newcastle United F.C. players
Darlington F.C. players
Ashington A.F.C. players
English Football League players
Date of death missing
Royal Naval Volunteer Reserve personnel of World War I
Civil Defence Service personnel